Drunk Like Bible Times is the second and final studio album by Arizona-based indie rock band Dear and the Headlights. It was released on September 30, 2008 through independent record label Equal Vision Records.

In an interview about the album, lead singer Ian Metzger said he was inspired by an Allen Ginsberg poem when he wrote the song "Carl Solomon Blues."

Track listing
 "I'm Not Crying. You're Not Crying, Are You?" - 2:56
 "Bad News" - 3:08
 "Carl Solomon Blues" - 3:20
 "Willetta" - 5:26
 "Talk About" - 3:43
 "Saintly Rows (Oh Oh)" - 3:38
 "Flowers For My Brain" - 4:10
 "Now It's Over" - 3:11
 "Parallel Lines" - 3:15
 "If Not For My Glasses" 2:50
 "Try" - 4:43
 "I Know" - 5:03

External links 
Equal Vision Records

References 

2008 albums
Dear and the Headlights albums